Boris Butenko (9 May 1923 – 26 November 1999) was a Soviet athlete. He competed in the men's discus throw at the 1952 Summer Olympics.

References

External links
 

1923 births
1999 deaths
Athletes (track and field) at the 1952 Summer Olympics
Soviet male discus throwers
Olympic athletes of the Soviet Union
Place of birth missing